The March for Justice on April 24, 2015 was a six-mile march of over 130,000 participants from the neighborhood designated as Little Armenia in Hollywood to the Turkish consulate of Los Angeles, demanding recognition of the Armenian genocide, which Turkey denies.

Speakers
Los Angeles Mayor Eric Garcetti said “From Mount Hollywood to Mount Ararat, today we cry and we cry out for those who were lost and those who are living,” he said. “One hundred years later, we shouldn’t have to take to the streets.”

Los Angeles Councilman Paul Krekorian spoke of his great-grandmother receiving a letter about what happened to her brother, a math professor at Euphrates College in eastern Turkey.  The brother had been seized by Turkish agents, who pulled the beard from his face. His tongue was cut out and he was left to die.

Counter-protest
About 30 pro-Turkey counter-protestors gathered briefly at the Turkish consulate.  There was a verbal confrontation, and eggs and water bottles were tossed.  The LAPD asked the pro-Turkey demonstrators to leave as the pro-Armenian crowd approached the consulate.

Forget-Me-Not
Many purple Forget-Me-Not flowers were displayed during the march, as this was the designated symbol of the centennial of the Armenian Genocide.

References

External links
 See the Armenian March for Justice From Above (LA Magazine)
 Armenian Genocide March for Justice Aerial Video
 Thousands march in Hollywood to mark 1915 Armenian massacre (ABC7)
 Massive March and Protest (KCAL 9)
 100,000 March From Hollywood to Turkish Consulate on Anniversary of 1915 Armenian Genocide  (KTLA)
100 years and 1.5 million lives later (Beverly Press)

Protest marches
Protest marches in the United States
Armenian American
Armenian genocide commemoration
Armenian genocide denial
2015 in North America